Murder in the Hills is a Bengali crime thriller web series streaming on the OTT platform hoichoi. The series was released on 23 July 2021. The series is directed by Anjan Dutt, who makes his directorial debut for a web series. This film is loosely based on the storyline of the famous detective novel of Agatha Christie, Murder on the Orient Express.

Plot 
Set in Darjeeling, Murder in The Hills is an engrossing and extremely dark story filled with very complex layered characters who have their own share of secrets and unwanted truths. The story surrounds around the seemingly natural death of a yesteryear film star named Tony Roy. The death however threatens to expose a dark past of the serene hill station. Amitabha, an ambitious investigative journalist, decides to get to the end of this mystery.

Cast 
 Anjan Dutt as Tony Roy
 Arjun Chakrabarty as Amitabha Banerjee
Anindita Bose as Sheela Bose
Rajdeep Gupta as DSP Subhankar Banerjee
Sourav Chakraborty as Bijoy Mukherjee
Sandipta Sen as Dr. Neema Pradhan
Suprobhat Das as Bob Das
Rajat Ganguly as Ranjan Ganguly
Saswati Guhathakurta as Mrs. Rama Roy
Suhotra Mukhopadhyay as a younger Tony Roy
Joydip Mukherjee as Mr. Raja Roy

Episodes

Season 1 (2021)
On 23 July 2021 hoichoi released all eight episodes of Murder in the Hills.

Episodes

Reception
Upam Buzarbaruah of Times of India writes, "Murder in the Hills has an Agatha Christie-esque title and premise. And the connection ends there."

References

External links

Indian web series
2021 web series debuts
Bengali-language web series
Films based on works by Agatha Christie
Hoichoi original programming